The Incredible Ira Sullivan, (full title The Incredible Ira Sullivan Plays Flugelhorn, Trumpet, Alto and Tenor Saxes, Flute and Afuche Cabasa),  is an album by multi-instrumentalist Ira Sullivan which was recorded in 1980 and released on the Stash label in 1981.

Reception

The AllMusic review by Scott Yanow stated "The title of this LP is not hype, for Ira Sullivan throughout the date shows off his impressive improvising skills ... He displays both his mastery of bop and of more advanced (and freer) ideas. A pretty definitive session by the underrated Ira Sullivan".

Track listing
 "Lonely Moments" (Simon Salz) – 4:47	
 "Our Delight" (Tadd Dameron) – 4:58
 "Bernie's Tune" (Bernie Miller) – 4:40
 "Kim's Lament" (Hale Rood) – 4:50
 "Can't Get Out of This Mood" (Frank Loesser, Jimmy McHugh) – 7:34
 "On the Seventh Day" (Jack Walrath) – 7:35
 "Satin Doll (Duke Ellington, Billy Strayhorn, Johnny Mercer) – 7:00

Personnel
Ira Sullivan – flute, alto saxophone, tenor saxophone, trumpet, flugelhorn, percussion
Hank Jones – piano
Eddie Gomez – bass
Duffy Jackson – drums

References

Stash Records albums
Ira Sullivan albums
1980 albums